Hypertension may refer to the following:
 Hypertension without a qualifier usually refers to arterial hypertension (high blood pressure of the arteries)
 Pregnancy-induced hypertension is newly diagnosed arterial hypertension in pregnant women
 White coat hypertension occurs in a clinical setting but not when measured by the patient at home
 Renovascular hypertension
 Hypertensive emergency (malignant hypertension)
 Ocular hypertension is elevated pressure inside the eye (intraocular pressure)
 Pulmonary hypertension, an elevated blood pressure in the pulmonary circulation
 Portal hypertension, an elevated blood pressure in the portal vein or portocaval system
 Intracranial hypertension refers to increased pressure inside the skull
 Hypertension (journal), a journal published by the American Heart Association